The 1958 European Cup final was a football match which took place at Heysel Stadium in Brussels, Belgium on 28 May 1958. It was contested by Real Madrid of Spain and Milan of Italy. Real Madrid won 3–2 after extra time to claim their third European Cup in a row.

After the match, the Real Madrid players were presented with their winners' medals by a 23-year-old Albert II of Belgium.

Route to the final

Match

Details

Match statistics

See also
1957–58 European Cup
A.C. Milan in European football
Real Madrid CF in international football competitions

Notes

References

External links
European Cup 1957/58 from UEFA
European Cup 1957/58 from RSSSF

1
Final
European Cup Final
European Cup Final 1958
European Cup Final 1958
European Cup Final 1958
1958
UEFA Champions League finals
European
Euro
European Cup Final
European Cup Final, 1958